Maximin (born at Silly near Poitiers; — Poitiers 12 September 346) was the sixth bishop of Trier. Maximin was an opponent of Arianism, and was supported by the courts of Constantine II and Constans, who harboured as an honored guest Athanasius twice during his exile from Alexandria, in 336–37 and again in 343. In the Arian controversy he had begun in the party of Paul I of Constantinople; however, he took part in the synod of Sardica convoked by Pope Julius I (ca. 342), and when four Arian bishops consequently came from Antioch to Trier with the purpose of winning Emperor Constans to their side, Maximinus refused to receive them and induced the emperor to reject their proposals.

Veneration
Maximin was interred in the cemetery outside the northern gate of Trier, where his remains were joined by later bishops in the multi-chambered crypt of a church dedicated to John the Evangelist, later rededicated as St. Maximin's Abbey, Trier. Gregory of Tours already attests to the cult of Maximin in the church of Saint John Evangelist and the cult offered at his grave. The Abbey – destroyed by Normans in 882, and rebuilt, then entirely re-built in the 1680s, secularised in 1802, bombed in World War II and since largely demolished – was one of the oldest in western Europe.

In iconology Maximin was portrayed as a bishop, with book, model of a church, and, borrowing from the legend of Corbinian, a bear carrying Maximin's travelling pack. As a patron, Maximin was invoked as protection against perjury, loss at sea and destructive rains. His cultus was strongest in the region around Trier and in Alsace.

Medieval legend conflated him with Maximinus of Aix, who was added to the Seventy Apostles referred to in the Gospel of Luke. That Maximinus was said to have accompanied Mary Magdalene and a company of the faithful to Aix-en-Provence, miraculously sped by a frail boat without a rudder or a mast. After Maximinus became the first Bishop of Aix-en-Provence Mary retired to the "right sharp desert" nearby for thirty years before being found and retrieved by Maximin just before her death. The thirteenth-century telling of the legend can be read in William Caxton's English translation of Jacobus de Voragine's Golden Legend. In fact this part of the legend is lifted from the Eastern story of Mary of Egypt and Zosimas of Palestine.  The cultus of Mary Magdalene and this Maximin in Provence was centered at Saint-Maximin-la-Sainte-Baume.  Other communes in France named Saint-Maximin commemorate one or the other saints named Maximin.

See also
 Saint Maximin of Trier, patron saint archive

Notes

External links

Bistum Trier Official website of the Diocese of Trier
Ökumenisches Heiligenlexikon: "Maximin von Trier"
(Ekkart Sauser) Schaff-Herzog, Biographisch-Bibliographische Kirchenlexikon: "Maximinus"

Year of birth unknown
346 deaths
4th-century bishops in Germania
4th-century Christian saints
Saints of Germania
Gallo-Roman saints
Roman Catholic bishops of Trier